The 1883–84 Football Association Challenge Cup was the 13th staging of the FA Cup, England's oldest football tournament. One hundred teams entered, sixteen more than the previous season, although three of the one hundred never played a match.

Preston North End was disqualified from the competition in February 1884, after an FA committee determined that the club had violated rules against professionalism by offering financial inducements to Scottish players.

First round

Replays

Second round

Replays

Third round

Fourth round

Replay

Fifth round

Replay

Semi finals

Final

Notes

References
 FA Cup Results Archive

1883-84
1883–84 in English football
1883–84 in Scottish football
FA Cup